During the 1973–74 English football season, Brentford competed in the Football League Fourth Division. A dreadful season, marred by infighting at boardroom level, resulted in a 19th-place finish, Brentford's lowest in the Football League since the 1925–26 season.

Season summary 
In the wake of Brentford's relegation straight back to the Fourth Division at the end of the previous season, manager Frank Blunstone, who had come to the end of his contract, left Griffin Park to take over as youth team manager at Manchester United. Despite the relegation, fan support for Blunstone was high and the finger of blame pointed at the board of directors, with one letter to the Middlesex Chronicle summing up the situation that the board's penny-pinching ways since 1967 were "necessary for a couple of years or so, but timidity of this sort prompts me to believe that promotion last year was an unwelcome accident, which has now been rectified". Brentford entered pre-season without a manager and training was taken by full back Alan Hawley and other senior professionals. Eventually former Wimbledon player-manager Mike Everitt was appointed as manager, just seven days before the beginning of the season. Everitt made no signings before the first match of the season and inherited a tiny 14-man squad, with backup goalkeeper Gary Towse being Brentford's only incoming transfer, signed two months earlier.

With Brentford one place above the re-election zone after seven league matches, manager Everitt began recruiting new players, including defender Gordon Riddick for a £4,000 fee and loanees Michael Brown and Hughie Reed. The signings had no immediate impact and Brentford sank to the bottom of the Football League after a 4–1 defeat to Scunthorpe United at the Old Showground. The loss meant that Brentford became the first club to occupy both first and last places in the Football League, having risen to top position during the early months of the 1937–38 season. Behind the scenes, the Brentford board had split into two factions, with one side pushing for a move to a new stadium and the other half wishing to stay at Griffin Park. Joint-chairmen Les Davey and Walter Wheatley were split on the matter and Wheatley became sole chairman of the club in January 1974, though he would be ousted two months later.

With Brentford still struggling on the field, midfielder Stewart Houston was sold to Manchester United in December 1973 for a club-record £55,000 fee, but the money was not immediately reinvested in the squad. The disharmony in the boardroom also spread to the playing squad, with Paul Bence, Alan Nelmes, Jackie Graham, Barry Salvage and Paul Priddy requesting moves away, though ultimately none would depart Griffin Park. A 10-match unbeaten run from mid-February through to early-April 1974 finally assured safety and youth products Richard Poole, Kevin Harding and Roy Cotton were able to be blooded, though none of the trio would make more than a handful of senior appearances for the club. Cambridge United forward Dave Simmonds and Bournemouth defender Jimmy Gabriel were brought in on transfer deadline day. Brentford ended the season in 19th place, the club's lowest finish in the Football League since the 1925–26 season. The average home league attendance of 5,063 was the lowest since the club joined the Football League in 1920.

League table

Results
Brentford's goal tally listed first.

Legend

Pre-season and friendlies

Football League Fourth Division

FA Cup

Football League Cup 

 Sources: 100 Years of Brentford, The Big Brentford Book of the Seventies,Croxford, Lane & Waterman, p. 304-305. Statto

Playing squad 
Players' ages are as of the opening day of the 1973–74 season.

 Sources: The Big Brentford Book of the Seventies, Timeless Bees

Coaching staff

Statistics

Appearances and goals
Substitute appearances in brackets.

Players listed in italics left the club mid-season.
Source: 100 Years of Brentford

Goalscorers 

Players listed in italics left the club mid-season.
Source: 100 Years of Brentford

Management

Summary

Transfers & loans

Awards 
 Supporters' Player of the Year: Peter Gelson
 Players' Player of the Year: Peter Gelson

References 

Brentford F.C. seasons
Brentford